Alfred Brockwell Wright (born 13 June 1999) is a British racing cyclist, who currently rides for UCI WorldTeam .

Career
Originally from south east London, Wright moved to Manchester at the age of 18 to join the British Cycling Senior Academy, with a focus on the track. In August 2019, Wright joined UCI WorldTeam  as a stagiaire for the second half of the season.

He was recruited to the team by Rod Ellingworth, the outfit's general manager, who had previously worked for the British Cycling Senior Academy. In April 2020 Wright won stage four of the Giro d'Italia Virtual, held during the Covid-19 crisis that stopped outdoor cycling races. In October 2020, he was named in the startlist for the 2020 Vuelta a España. At the Vuelta he placed fourth on the fifteenth stage of the race.

2022
2022 was a breakthrough season for Wright as he took a top-10 at the Tour of Flanders from the breakaway. At the Tour de France Wright was again an active breakaway rider, recording two top-10s from the break including a 2nd place, and then in the penultimate stage's 40.7km individual time trial, Wright managed 8th place. At the Commonwealth Games a few weeks after the end of the Tour de France, Wright won a Silver medal in the individual time trial event, behind Rohan Dennis, but beating a pre-race favourite, Geraint Thomas. Cyclingnews.com commented on Wright's 2022 season that "[t]he Vuelta a España was confirmation that Wright seems to be getting better and better this summer, bothering the top reaches of the results sheets in breakaways and bunch sprints", and tipped him as a contender for the World Championships road race for 2022.

2022 Vuelta and controversy
At the 2022 Vuelta a España, Wright scored, via sprint finishes and breakaways, seven top-10 stage results, including three top-3 results, but didn't manage to win a stage. During the race he was the subject of controversy: during the closing kilometres of Stage 16, a small group of four, including Wright, followed Primož Roglič, then placed second in the General Classification, as he attacked out of the peloton. As the lead quintet sprinted for the win, Roglič collided with Wright, causing the former to crash heavily while the latter was able to stay upright. Roglič crossed the line with several cuts on his right side.  Two days later, Roglič issued a statement via his team: “My conclusion is that the way this crash happened is unacceptable. Not everyone saw it correctly. The crash was not caused by a bad road or a lack of safety but by a rider's behaviour. I don't have eyes on my back. Otherwise, I would have run wide. Wright came from behind and rode the handlebars out of my hands before I knew it." This statement was criticised by other riders and teams. Roglič's fellow Slovene Matej Mohorič defended Wright, saying "It's not appropriate and it's not fair to make a statement like that toward Fred [...] I think if you ask the peloton, everyone will tell you that Primož is more eager to push for position than Fred. We know that Primož crashes a lot and this is not the first time this happened."

Personal life
As of 2021, Wright lived in Manchester, sharing a house with fellow racing cyclist Ethan Hayter.

Major results

Road

2016
 1st  Overall Junior Tour of Wales
 5th Overall Trofeo Karlsberg
1st  Young rider classification
2017
 3rd Overall Junior Tour of Wales
1st  Mountains classification
2018
 2nd Road race, National Under-23 Championships
 2nd Overall Ronde de l'Oise
1st  Young rider classification
1st Stage 3
 5th Road race, National Championships
 7th Overall Paris–Arras Tour
2019
 1st Stage 4 Tour de l'Avenir
 1st Stage 7 Giro Ciclistico d'Italia
 3rd Overall Paris–Arras Tour
 5th Time trial, National Under-23 Championships
2021
 1st  Road race, National Under-23 Championships
 National Championships
2nd Road race
4th Time trial
 10th Eschborn–Frankfurt
2022
 Commonwealth Games
2nd  Time trial
5th Road race
 7th Tour of Flanders
 Vuelta a España
Held  after Stage 5

Grand Tour general classification results timeline

Track

2016
 1st  Team pursuit, UEC European Junior Championships
 3rd Madison (with Jake Stewart), National Championships
2017
 UEC European Junior Championships
1st  Omnium
2nd  Team pursuit
 2nd Individual pursuit, National Junior Championships
2018
 National Championships
1st  Team pursuit
3rd Points
2019
 National Championships
1st  Madison (with Rhys Britton)
2nd Omnium
 1st  Madison (with Matt Walls), UEC European Under-23 Championships

References

External links

1999 births
Living people
British male cyclists
English male cyclists
English track cyclists
Sportspeople from Manchester
Cyclists from Greater London
Commonwealth Games silver medallists for England
Commonwealth Games medallists in cycling
Cyclists at the 2022 Commonwealth Games
Medallists at the 2022 Commonwealth Games